Glyphostoma immaculata is a species of sea snail, a marine gastropod mollusk in the family Clathurellidae.

Description

Distribution
This species occurs in the Gulf of Panama.

References

immaculata
Gastropods described in 1908